Hemswell Cliff is a village and civil parish in the West Lindsey district of Lincolnshire, England. It is situated on the A631 road between Caenby Corner and Gainsborough and on the Lincoln Cliff escarpment. According to the 2001 Census it had a population of 683.

RAF Hemswell was located on the site from 1937 until it closed in 1967. The airfield site was subsequently redeveloped into a private trading estate and the RAF married quarters into a residential area which became a newly created civil parish of Hemswell Cliff. The old village of Hemswell remains as a separate parish.

By mid-2008 there was no longer RAF presence on the site, which became civilian. The site's old H-Block buildings contains an antique centre, shops, a garden centre, hairdresser, used book shop and cafés.

The RAF sold the community centre (originally built as the Sergeants' Mess) in 2009 but it remained unused until 2021 when the Broadcast Engineering Conservation Group, a charity, bought it. They began to repair 12 years of decay and started to create the Broadcast Engineering Museum. The group held its first public open days in September 2022.

Hemswell Cliff Primary School is in the village.

References

External links

 Hemswell Cliff Parish Council site

Villages in Lincolnshire
Civil parishes in Lincolnshire
West Lindsey District